Kristian Williams (born 1974) is an American anarchist author. He is best known as the author of Our Enemies In Blue: Police and Power in America.

Publications
Williams, Kristian. Our Enemies in Blue: Police and Power in America. Brooklyn, NY: Soft Skull Press, 2004. According to WorldCat, the book is held in 583 libraries 
Williams, Kristian. American Methods: Torture and the Logic of Domination. Cambridge, Mass: South End Press, 2006, . According to WorldCat, the book is held in 309 libraries 
Williams, Kristian, scott crow. Witness To Betrayal/Profiles of Provocateurs. AK Press / Emergency Hearts Press. 2015, 
Williams, Kristian, William Munger, and Lara Messersmith-Glavin. Life During Wartime: Resisting Counterinsurgency. Oakland, CA : AK Press,  2013. According to WorldCat, the book is held in 155 libraries 
Williams, Kristian, and Adam Gnade. Hurt: Notes on Torture in a Modern Democracy. Microcosm Publishing, 2012, 
Williams, Kristian. Resist Everything Except Temptation: The Anarchist Philosophy of Oscar Wilde. AK Press, 2020,

See also
 Invention of police

References

External links
 Kristian Williams
 Kristian Williams

American anarchists
Living people
Anarcho-communists
1974 births
Writers from Oregon
Anarchist writers